The 1991 Pan American Games, officially known as the XI Pan American Games, were a continental multi-sport event held in Havana, Cuba, from August 2 to August 18, 1991. At the Games, 4,519 athletes selected from 39 National Olympic Committees (NOCs) participated in events in 27 sports. Twenty-six nations earned medals during the competition, and fourteen won at least one gold medal.

Medal table 

The ranking in this table is based on medal counts published by several media organizations. By default, the table is ordered by the number of gold medals won by the athletes representing a nation. (In this context, a nation is an entity represented by a NOC). The number of silver medals is taken into consideration next and then the number of bronze medals. If nations are still tied, equal ranking is given and they are listed alphabetically by IOC country code.

To sort this table by nation, total medal count, or any other column, click on the  icon next to the column title.

References 

General

 
Additional
 
 

Specific

See also 

Medal table
Pan American Games medal tables